"Why So Serious" is a song by German-Canadian singer Alice Merton. Merton co-wrote the song with producer Nicolas Rebscher.

Charts

References

2018 songs
2018 singles
Song recordings produced by John Hill (record producer)